This is a list of wars and conflicts involving Trinidad and Tobago.

List

 
Trinidad and Tobago
Wars